Maikel Folch Vera (born 1980 in Florencia, Ciego de Ávila Province, Cuba) is a left-handed pitcher for the Cuba national baseball team. Folch plays for Ciego de Ávila in the Cuban National Series, where he posted a league-low 2.09 ERA during the 2004-05 season, compiling a 10-0 record.

Folch played for Cuba at the 2006 World Baseball Classic.

References

External links
 

1980 births
Living people
People from Florencia, Cuba
Cuban baseball players
2006 World Baseball Classic players